Fools Creek is a stream in Ralls County in the U.S. state of Missouri. It is a tributary of the Mississippi River.

Fools Creek was named for an incident when a drunk person drowned in the creek even though the water was shallow.

See also
List of rivers of Missouri

References

Rivers of Ralls County, Missouri
Rivers of Missouri